The Metropolitan Borough of Bermondsey was a Metropolitan borough in the County of London, created in 1900 by the London Government Act 1899. It was abolished and its area became part of the London Borough of Southwark in 1965.

Formation and boundaries
The borough was formed from four civil parishes: St Mary Magdalen Bermondsey, St Mary Rotherhithe, Southwark St John Horsleydown and Southwark St Olave and St Thomas. In 1904 these four were combined into a single civil parish called Bermondsey, which was conterminous with the metropolitan borough.

Previous to the borough's formation it had been administered by three separate local bodies: St Olave District Board of Works, Bermondsey Vestry and Rotherhithe Vestry.

History
The Victorian vestry hall on Spa Road, SE16, was bombed during the Second World War. After the war the neighbouring Municipal Offices (1928, designed by H Tansley) took over the role. Bermondsey Town Hall continued to house civic offices, latterly for Southwark Council, until being sold off in 2012.

The population declined sharply after the Second World War, being cut by about half from 1931 to 1951.

Coat of arms
The borough was granted a coat of arms in 1901. The design included references to the three constituent authorities. The lion, crozier and two letters B represent Bermondsey vestry, and are derived from the insignia of Bermondsey Abbey.  The crown and axe were the emblem of St Olave's District Board of Works, and were derived from the royal arms of Norway, Saint Olave being the anglicised name of King Olaf II of Norway. The ship represented Rotherhithe and the Surrey Commercial Docks. The symbolism in the coat of arms were incorporated into a sculpture called The Bermondsey Lion that was unveiled in The Blue in 2011.

The Latin motto adopted by the borough was Prosunt gentibus artes or "Arts profit the people", and was adapted from Ovid's Metamorphoses.

Population and area
The population from the Census returns was:

Constituent parishes 1801–1899

Metropolitan Borough 1900-1961

Politics

The borough was divided into twelve wards for elections: No. 1 Bermondsey, No. 2 Bermondsey, No. 3 Bermondsey, No. 4 Bermondsey, No. 5 Bermondsey, No. 6 Bermondsey, No. 1 Rotherhithe, No. 2 Rotherhithe, No. 3 Rotherhithe, St John, St Olave and St Thomas.

Borough council
In the first election to the borough council, held on 1 November 1900 the Moderates (supported by the Conservative party) gained a majority. The opposition group was formed by the Progressive Party. The Moderates retained their majority at the 1903 elections. In 1906 the Moderate group was renamed Municipal Reform. In 1909 The Progressives won 27 seats and the Independent Labour Party 1 to the Municipal Reform's 26 seats, but the latter party retained power through the aldermanic elections. They regained an overall majority of councillors at the 1912 elections.

Local elections were postponed during the First World War, with the next poll held in 1919. The results were a major reverse for the Municipal Reform party with just two councillors elected. The Progressives formed the largest party with 27 seats, followed by the Labour Party with 24. There was one independent councillor. At the 1922 elections Labour gained a majority with 38 seats. The opposition was formed by a Ratepayers Association with 14 councillors. Labour held the council at the subsequent elections, holding all the seats from 1934 to 1945 and from 1949 until the borough's abolition.

Parliament constituency
For elections to Parliament, the borough was divided into two constituencies:
Bermondsey
Rotherhithe
In 1918 the boundaries of the borough's two seats were adjusted, and one was renamed:
Bermondsey West
Rotherhithe
In 1950 the borough's representation was reduced to one seat:
Bermondsey

References

Further reading

External links
A Vision of Britain
Bermondsey coat of arms

Metropolitan boroughs of the County of London
History of the London Borough of Southwark
1900 establishments in the United Kingdom
1965 disestablishments in the United Kingdom
Districts abolished by the London Government Act 1963
Metropolitan Borough of